Mihaela Ciolacu (born 12 August 1998) is a Romanian footballer who plays as a midfielder and has appeared for the Romania women's national team.

Career
Ciolacu has been capped for the Romania national team, appearing for the team during the 2019 FIFA Women's World Cup qualifying cycle.

International goals
Scores and results list Romania's goal tally first.

References

External links
 
 
 

1998 births
Living people
Romanian women's footballers
Romania women's international footballers
Women's association football midfielders
FCU Olimpia Cluj players